This is a list of Azerbaijan football transfers in the winter transfer window 2014 by club. Only clubs of the 2013–14 Azerbaijan Premier League are included.

Azerbaijan Premier League 2013-14

AZAL

In:

 

 

Out:

Baku

In:

Out:

Gabala

In:

 

Out:

Inter Baku

In:

 
 
 

Out:

Khazar Lankaran

In:

 
 
 
 
 

 

Out:

Neftchi Baku

In:

 

 

 

Out:

Qarabağ

In:

  

Out:

Ravan Baku

In:

 

Out:

Simurq

In:

 

Out:

Sumgayit

In:

 

Out:

References

Azerbaijani football transfer lists
Azerbaijan